Adele Sandrock (born Adele Feldern-Förster; 19 August 1863 – 30 August 1937) was a German-Dutch actress. After a successful theatrical career, she became one of the first German movie stars.

Early life

Sandrock was born in Rotterdam, Netherlands, the daughter of the German merchant Eduard Sandrock (1834–1897) and his Dutch wife, Johanna Simonetta ten Hagen (1833–1917). With sister Wilhelmine (1861-1948) and brother Christian (1862–1924), she grew up in Rotterdam, and, after her parents' divorce on 15 November 1869, in Berlin.

Career

In 1878 at the age of fifteen, Sandrock made her debut as Selma in Mutter und Sohn by Charlotte Birch-Pfeiffer. In Berlin she met the famous Meiningen Ensemble and achieved success at the theatre of Meiningen, where her first role was Luise in Friedrich Schiller's Intrigue and Love, followed by further engagements in Moscow, Wiener Neustadt, and Budapest.

In 1889, she had her breakthrough at the Theater an der Wien in Vienna and afterwards became a member of the Volkstheater ensemble. She created a number of major roles for modern playwrights including Henrik Ibsen and Arthur Schnitzler, with whom she had a notoriously stormy affair, later perpetuated in his play La Ronde.

She was briefly engaged to marry author Alexander Roda Roda, who  integrated the experience in his writing. From 1895, she performed at the Burgtheater, however, she provoked disagreement concerning both her contract and her private life, and she left for an extended European tour in 1898. Back at the Volkstheater in 1902, she was not able to continue her success on the stage. In 1905, she moved back to Berlin, to work at the Deutsches Theater led by Max Reinhardt.

In 1911 Sandrock made her silent film debut in Marianne, ein Weib aus dem Volke, a short subject. She acted in more than 140 films, working with a number of directors including Reinhold Schünzel and Hans Hinrich, and even continued her career into the sound film era with her characteristic dark voice. Her autobiography, Mein Leben, was published in 1940.

Death
Sandrock died on 30 August 1937 in Berlin, Germany, at the age of 74.

Selected filmography

 Unusable (1917)
 The Galley Slave (1919)
 Patience (1920)
 Hearts are Trumps (1920)
 The Last Kolczaks (1920)
 Lady Hamilton (1921)
 Violet (1921)
 Children of Darkness (1921)
 Nights of Terror (1921)
 The Story of Christine von Herre (1921)
 The Black Panther (1921)
 Lucrezia Borgia (1922)
 The Golden Net (1922)
 The Hungarian Princess (1923)
 The Love of a Queen (1923)
 Helena (1924)
 The Girl with a Patron (1925)
 Ash Wednesday (1925)
 German Hearts on the German Rhine (1926)
 Orphan of Lowood (1926)
 Trude (1926)
 Assassination (1927)
 Rhenish Girls and Rhenish Wine (1927)
 Light-Hearted Isabel (1927)
 German Women - German Faithfulness (1927)
 Queen Louise (1927)
 The Mistress (1927)
 Poor Little Sif (1927)
 The City of a Thousand Delights (1927)
 The Girl with the Five Zeros (1927)
 Heaven on Earth (1927)
 Leontine's Husbands (1928)
 Lotte (1928)
 Der Ladenprinz (1928)
 Serenissimus and the Last Virgin (1928)
 Mary Lou (1928)
 Mariett Dances Today (1928)
 Misled Youth (1929)
 Katharina Knie (1929)
 My Daughter's Tutor (1929)
 Revolt in the Batchelor's House (1929)
 The Circus Princess (1929)
 Fräulein Else (1929)
 Danube Waltz (1930)
 Next, Please! (1930)
 The Great Longing (1930)
 The Tender Relatives (1930)
 Scandalous Eva (1930)
 The Battle of Bademunde (1931)
 Queen of the Night (1931)
 Without Meyer, No Celebration is Complete (1931)
 Her Majesty the Barmaid (1931)
 Terror of the Garrison (1931)
 The Forester's Daughter (1931)
 The Soaring Maiden (1931)
 Everyone Asks for Erika (1931)
 Frederica (1932)
 A Tremendously Rich Man (1932)
 The Mad Bomberg (1932)
 The Magic Top Hat (1932)
 Love at First Sight (1932)
 A Mad Idea (1932)
 I Do Not Want to Know Who You Are (1932)
 The Beautiful Adventure (1932)
 The Victor (1932)
 The Importance of Being Earnest (1932)
 The Big Bluff (1933)
 Bon Voyage (1933)
 Little Girl, Great Fortune (1933)
 A Woman Like You (1933)
 Daughter of the Regiment (1933)
 The English Marriage (1934)
 The Brenken Case (1934)
 Gypsy Blood (1934)
  The Gentleman Without a Residence (1934)
 Spring Parade (1934)
 Count Woronzeff (1934)
 The Last Waltz (1934)
 Paganini (1934)
 Amphitryon (1935)
 Every Day Isn't Sunday (1935)
 The Fight with the Dragon (1935)
 The King's Prisoner (1935)
 Make Me Happy (1935)
 Circus Saran (1935)
 Heaven on Earth (1935)
 Fruit in the Neighbour's Garden (1935)
 The Empress's Favourite  (1936)
 There Were Two Bachelors (1936)

References

External links

 
 Virtual History - Tobacco cards

1863 births
1937 deaths
Dutch stage actresses
Dutch film actresses
Dutch silent film actresses
Dutch people of German descent
German stage actresses
German film actresses
German silent film actresses
German people of Dutch descent
Actors from Rotterdam
Actors from Berlin
19th-century Dutch actresses
20th-century Dutch actresses
19th-century German actresses
20th-century German actresses